Günter Hans Sauerbrey (January 1, 1933 – May 15, 2003) was a German physicist who invented the quartz crystal microbalance (QCM).

Biography 
Günter Sauerbrey obtained his Ph.D from the Technical University of Berlin. He was responsible of the Laboratory of Medical Techniques and Dosimetry of the Physikalisch-Technische Bundesanstalt (PTB) in Berlin for 24 years (from 1974 to 1998).

Research contributions 
Günter Sauerbrey invented the quartz crystal microbalance. He developed the research related to QCM in his doctoral thesis at the Technical University of Berlin and published it in two seminals papers in 1957 and 1959. He was the first to use a harmonic acceleration field to measure mass, although he was not aware about this in the moment of publication.

Together with the quartz crystal microbalance, he developed the Sauerbrey equation to explain the working principle of the device. Later, other authors developed derivative equations for different cases.

See also 
 Sauerbrey constant
 Sauerbrey layer
 Sauerbrey mass
 Sauerbrey thickness

References

Further reading
 https://www.dpg-physik.de/vereinigungen/fachlich/ohne-sektion/fvgp/pdf/gp-xii.pdf
 https://www.ptb.de/cms/en/presseaktuelles/journalisten/news-press-releases/archives-of-press-releases/archive-of-press-release.html?tx_news_pi1%5Bnews%5D=1328&tx_news_pi1%5Bcontroller%5D=News&tx_news_pi1%5Baction%5D=detail&tx_news_pi1%5Bday%5D=17&tx_news_pi1%5Bmonth%5D=2&tx_news_pi1%5Byear%5D=1998&cHash=43d4ed12c97e6bdba0bd4893e8fae703
 https://www.zeit.de/1983/50/der-weg-in-die-daddelhalle/seite-3
 https://books.google.com/books?id=kwxWDwAAQBAJ&pg=PA291&lpg=PA291
 https://www.uni-frankfurt.de/72296959/20180605_sensors.pdf
 https://onlinelibrary.wiley.com/action/doSearch?ContribAuthorStored=Sauerbrey%2C+G%C3%BCnter

External links 
 
 http://www.qcmlab.com

1933 births
2003 deaths
20th-century German physicists